Llwynmawr is a village in the Ceiriog Valley in North Wales, about halfway between the villages of Glyn Ceiriog and Pontfadog, in the community of Glyntraian. The name means "big grove".

References

Villages in Wrexham County Borough